Shanghai Huayi (Group) Company is a Chinese chemistry enterprise group. There are more than 20 wholly or partially owned subsidiaries in coal power, plastics, rubber products and other areas of chemical industry. The group has nearly 40,000 employees

Shanghai Huayi have joint ventures with the international companies DuPont, BASF, Bayer, Michelin, Cabot and Arkema.

Subsidiaries 
 Double Coin Holdings LTD
 Shanghai Tianyuan (Group) Co., Ltd
 Shanghai Coking & Chemical Co., Ltd.
 Shanghai Chlor-Alkali Chemical Co., Ltd.
 Shanghai Wujing Chemical Co., Ltd.

References 
 http://www.shhuayi.com/e_HYInternet/gs_jj.htm
 http://investing.businessweek.com/research/stocks/private/snapshot.asp?privcapId=22431999
 https://web.archive.org/web/20111005144752/http://fec2.mofcom.gov.cn/aarticle/listofchina/200609/20060903096281.html
 https://web.archive.org/web/20120523170119/http://companies.china.org.cn/trade/company/478.html

External links 
Official Website

Chemical companies of China
Manufacturing companies based in Shanghai
Tire manufacturers of China